(English: 'Blue Code') is a Czech medical television series broadcast on Prima televize. The plot of the series focuses on the emergency department. Each episode follows cases inspired by real-life stories and the cases of patients and healthcare professionals.

It was followed by Sestřičky and 1. mise.

Cast
 Marek Němec as MUDr. David Hofbauer
 Sabina Laurinová as Bc. Marie Černá
 Eva Josefíková as MUDr. Lucie Krutinová
 Roman Zach as MUDr. Roman Nikolajev Vilkin (Rasputin)
 Jiří Štěpnička as doc. MUDr. Jiří Bojan, DrSc.
 Igor Chmela as MUDr. Viktor Žák
 Marika Procházková as MUDr. Valentina Slavíčková (Vali)
 Ondřej Rychlý as MUDr. Prokop Hlinka
 Eva Burešová as Petra Horvátová
 Filip Cíl as Jan Čermák (Honza)
 Lenka Zahradnická as Jana Kočová
 Sandra Nováková as MUDr. Alexandra Růžičková (Saša)
 Mojmír Maděrič as MUDr. Miloš Valenta
 Roman Skamene as Roman Váňa
 Viktor Limr as MUDr. Aleš Nývlt
 Kristýna Frejová as MUDr. Ema Vlčková
 Berenika Kohoutová as MUDr. Zoja Višněvská
 David Gránský as MUDr. Matyáš Bojan (Maty)
 Anastázie Chocholatá as Eva Zemánková
 Petr Konáš as MUDr. Filip Kodym
 Michaela Sejnová as Libuše Volejníková (Libuška)
 Adam Kraus as Benedikt Lichý (Ben)
 Jana Stryková as MUDr. Nina Mrázová
 Tomáš Měcháček as MUDr. Adam Brejcha
 Renata Prokopová as Bc. Šárka Pokorná
 Petr Buchta as MUDr. Kamil Prchlík
 Vanda Chaloupková as MUDr. Veronika Jánská
 Saša Rašilov as MUDr. Michal Tomášek
 Marko Igonda as MUDr. Marián Klimko
 Patricie Pagáčová as JUDr. Bc. Laura Hrdinová, MBA
 Zuzana Bydžovská as MUDr. Jana Mašková
 Alois Švehlík as doc. MUDr. Milan Šeřík
 Štěpánka Fingerhutová as Dita Stárková

References

External links

2017 Czech television series debuts
Czech action television series
Czech drama television series
Czech medical television series
Prima televize original programming